The Robthorne Mystery is a 1934 detective novel by John Rhode, the pen name of the British writer Cecil Street. It is the seventeenth in his long-running series of novels featuring Lancelot Priestley, a Golden Age armchair detective. It was published in the United States the same year by Dodd Mead.

Reviewing the book for The Sunday Times Dorothy L. Sayers wrote "One always embarks on a John Rhode book with a great feeling of security. One knows that there will be a sound plot, a well-knit process of reasoning, and a solidly satisfying solution with no loose ends or careless errors of fact." Isaac Anderson in The New York Times remarked that "no one who has ever read a Dr. Priestley story will be surprised to learn that this is a genuinely baffling crime puzzle of the first quality".

Synopsis
Warwick Robthorne is found dead on Guy Fawkes Night in the greenhouse of his brother Maurice's large country home. Apparently a victim of suicide. This coincides with a police operation in London led by Inspector Hanslet against a gang of drug smugglers. It falls to the gifted criminologist to tie all the evidence together between the two cases.

References

Bibliography
 Evans, Curtis. Masters of the "Humdrum" Mystery: Cecil John Charles Street, Freeman Wills Crofts, Alfred Walter Stewart and the British Detective Novel, 1920-1961. McFarland, 2014.
 Herbert, Rosemary. Whodunit?: A Who's Who in Crime & Mystery Writing. Oxford University Press, 2003.
 Reilly, John M. Twentieth Century Crime & Mystery Writers. Springer, 2015.

1934 British novels
Novels by Cecil Street
British crime novels
British mystery novels
British detective novels
Collins Crime Club books
Novels set in London